Pseudonocardia tetrahydrofuranoxydans is a Gram-positive, rod-shaped and non-spore-forming bacterium from the genus of Pseudonocardia which has been isolated from water from a waste water treatment plant in Germany.

References

Pseudonocardia
Bacteria described in 2006